Isaac "Isak" Férriz Álvaro (born 20 June 1979) is an Andorran-born actor and director based in Barcelona.

Biography 
Born in Andorra la Vella on 20 June 1979, Férriz's parents were originally from the area of Gràcia in Barcelona, which he regularly visited when he was a child. He lived in Andorra until he was 18, when he moved to Barcelona, training at the Nancy Tuñón's acting school. His television debut came with a performance in the Laberint d'ombres series, aired on the Catalan public broadcaster. He landed roles in teen dramas such as Al salir de clase, Compañeros and Física o Química, as well as in the Catalan telenovela Ventdelplà.

He starred as the lead character (the 17th-century bandit ) in the 2008 television miniseries  and as Roberto Pérez (a day laborer who engages in a love triangle with the other two main characters) in the daily television series Bandolera. After starring as the ruthless Daniel Guerrero in the Movistar+ crime drama series Gigantes (2018–2019), Férriz resumed collaboration with director Enrique Urbizu in Libertad, set to play a bandit once again. Later in 2020, Férriz joined the production of the Netflix fantasy thriller series Feria as cast member.

Besides his better-known work as an actor, Férriz has also worked as a director.

Filmography 

Television

Film

Awards and nominations

References

External links 

1979 births
Andorran actors
21st-century Spanish male actors
Living people